Carl Donnelly (born 13 January 1982 in Tooting, south London) is a British stand-up, dancer, comedian, and writer. He turned vegan in 2013, and has since become an ambassador for Veganuary. He has talked about being vegan extensively in his act.

Stand-up career
Donnelly has appeared on radio in BBC Radio 4's 28 Acts in 28 Minutes, LBC's Comedy Cabaret and Tim Shaw's The Asylum on Kerrang! Radio. He has appeared on TV in Mock the Week, Russell Howard's Good News, Stand Up Central, and Alan Davies: As Yet Untitled.

Podcasts 
Donnelly hosted The Carl Donnelly And Chris Martin Comedy Podcast alongside comedian Chris Martin from 2008 to 2018. They also hosted a spin-off, Babysitting Trevor, along with Trevor Cook. Carl now co-hosts TVI with Carl Donnelly and Julian Deane.

Personal Life

Carl was previously married in his 20s, writing about his divorce in his act. He is a supporter of Tottenham Hotspur football club.

Awards
 Laughing Horse New Act of the Year 2006
 Chortle Awards Best Newcomer 2007
 Leicester Mercury Comedian of the Year 2007
 Edinburgh Comedy Awards Best Newcomer Nominee 2009
 Edinburgh Comedy Awards Best Show Nominee 2013
 Chortle Awards Best Club Comedian 2017

Edinburgh Fringe shows
 Relax Everyone, It's Carl Donnelly! (2009)
 How Do You Solve A Problem Like Carl Donnelly? (2010)
 Carl Donnelly 3: Carl Donnelier! (2011)
 Carl Donnelly: Different Gravy (2012)
 Now That's What I Carl Donnelly! Volume V (2013)
 Now That's What I Carl Donnelly Vol. 6 (2014)
  Carl Donnelly: Jive Ass Honky (2015)
  Carl Donnelly: Bad Man Tings (2016)
  Carl Donnelly: The Nutter on the Bus (2017)
  Strictly Carl Donnelly! (2018
 Carl Donnelly: Shall We All Just Kill Ourselves? (2019)

References

External links
 
 Official website
 Chortle biography
 2007 BBC review
 

1982 births
21st-century English comedians
British veganism activists
English male comedians
English people of Irish descent
Living people
People from Tooting